Wouter Van der Fraenen (born 8 July 1980) is a Belgian rower. He competed in the men's lightweight double sculls event at the 2004 Summer Olympics.

References

External links
 

1980 births
Living people
Belgian male rowers
Olympic rowers of Belgium
Rowers at the 2004 Summer Olympics
Sportspeople from Bruges